Chilli 90.1fm (call sign 7EXX) is an Australian radio station in Tasmania. Owned and operated by ARN, it broadcasts a contemporary hit radio format to Launceston and surrounding areas. First broadcast in 1938 as 7EX, the station currently broadcasts from studios in York Street, alongside sister station 89.3 LAFM. Chilli90.1fm also has a Scottsdale version called ”Chilli99.7FM“ which has repeat frequencies of 99.7mHz in Scottsdale and the North-East of Tasmania and 94.5mHz in Weldborough and St Helens, Tasmania.

History
The station was set up in 1938 by The Examiner newspaper and shared a fierce rivalry with rival 7LA, splitting the city's audience through much of the 1980s. Eventually, the station changed hands numerous times, before forming the TOTE Sports Radio horse racing radio network.

In 2002, television station ABNT-3 vacated VHF channel 3, opening up space for further FM radio services in Launceston. In 2005, it was announced that 7EX, along with 7LA and ABC Northern Tasmania was to move to the FM band - 7LA on 89.3, 7EX on 90.1 and ABC Northern Tasmania on 91.7. In 2010, Grant Broadcasters purchased the 7EX licence from TOTE Sports Radio - who in turn purchased a narrowcast licence on 7EX's old AM frequency - before relaunching in 2011 as contemporary hit radio-formatted Chilli 90.1fm.

Today, the station networks the majority of its programming to Scottsdale-based Chilli 99.7.

In November 2021, Chilli FM, along with other stations owned by Grant Broadcasters, was acquired by the Australian Radio Network. This deal will allow Grant's stations, including Chilli FM, to access ARN's iHeartRadio platform in regional areas.  The deal was finalized on January 4, 2022. It is expected Chilli FM will integrate with ARN's KIIS Network but will retain its current name according to the press release from ARN.

On Air
Weekdays:
Breakfast 6am-10am  Issy For Breakfast
Mornings 10am-1pm   Kayden Cooper
Workdays 1pm-5pm    Jackie Harvey
Drive 5pm-7pm  Will & Woody 
Kyle & Jackie O Hour of Power 7pm-8pm

References

External links
Chilli 90.1fm official website

Radio stations in Tasmania
Radio stations established in 1930
Adult contemporary radio stations in Australia
Australian Radio Network